The Shire of Narracan was a local government area about  east-southeast of Melbourne, the state capital of Victoria, Australia.

History

Narracan was first incorporated as a shire on 20 September 1878. Due in part to its location at the crossroads of the Latrobe Valley region, many changes occurred to its boundaries, especially from the 1940s onwards, during the post-war industrial boom in the region.

Parts of the shire's South Riding were annexed to the Shire of Morwell on 27 May 1892, while the Shire of Mirboo was created out of parts of its East and West Ridings on 13 April 1894. Over the following years, several parts were annexed to the Shire of Woorayl. On 29 May 1918, it absorbed the Shire of Walhalla, a  region which had existed since 1872, firstly as a borough, then as a shire.

On 28 August 1955, the Borough of Moe was severed and incorporated, and parts were annexed to Moe on 1 October 1990.

On 2 December 1994, the Shire of Narracan was abolished, and along with the Rural City of Warragul, the Shire of Buln Buln and parts of the Shire of Upper Yarra, was merged into the newly created Shire of Baw Baw.

Wards

The Shire of Narracan was divided into four ridings, each of which elected three councillors:
 North Riding
 East Riding
 West Riding
 Walhalla Riding

Towns and localities
 Allambee
 Coalville
 Erica
 Moondarra
 Narracan
 Rawson
 Tanjil South
 Thorpdale
 Trafalgar*
 Walhalla
 Willow Grove
 Yallourn North
 Yarragon

* Council seat.

Population

* Estimate in the 1958 Victorian Year Book.

References

External links
 Victorian Places - Narracan Shire

Narracan